Armatocereus godingianus is a species of Armatocereus from Ecuador and Peru.

References

External links
 
 

godingianus
Flora of Ecuador